Dahaneh (also Romanized as Dahneh; also known as Dahānā) is a village in Irandegan Rural District, Irandegan District, Khash County, Sistan and Baluchestan Province, Iran. At the 2006 census, its population was 209, in 45 families.

References 

Populated places in Khash County